Pallejà is a municipality in the comarca of the Baix Llobregat in Catalonia, Spain. It is situated on the right bank of the Llobregat river, on the main N-II road. The main rail lines of the Llobregat corridor pass through the town: the station is served by the FGC services R5/R50, R6, S4 and S8. Pallejà castle was built in the seventeenth century on the site of an older fortress; it currently houses a library.

Demography

References

 Panareda Clopés, Josep Maria; Rios Calvet, Jaume; Rabella Vives, Josep Maria (1989). Guia de Catalunya, Barcelona: Caixa de Catalunya.  (Spanish).  (Catalan).

External links
 Government data pages 

Municipalities in Baix Llobregat